Boucicault is a surname.

Notable people with the name include 
Dion Boucicault (1820–1890), Irish actor and playwright, and his children:
Aubrey Boucicault (1868–1913), British actor
Dion Boucicault Jr. (1859–1929), Irish actor and stage director
Nina Boucicault (1867–1950), English actress

See also
Boucicaut (disambiguation)